John Dancy may refer to:
 John Christopher Dancy, English headmaster
 John C. Dancy, politician, journalist, and educator in North Carolina and Washington, DC.